Ma & Pa are English nicknames for "mother" and "father", respectively.

Ma & Pa might also refer to:

 Ma and Pa Kettle, a husband-and-wife pair of characters in Betty MacDonald's novel, The Egg and I, and the associated film franchise.  
 The Maryland and Pennsylvania Railroad, a defunct US railroad operating in its namesake states.

See also
Ma (disambiguation)
Pa (disambiguation)